Derhachi is a town in Kharkiv Raion, Kharkiv Oblast (province) of eastern Ukraine. The settlement was founded in the second half of the 17th century as a sloboda. It hosts the administration of Derhachi urban hromada, one of the hromadas of Ukraine. Population:

Etymology 
There are at least two versions of the origin of the town name. The first is connected with the term derkach, the Ukrainian name for the corncrake that inhabits the banks of the local Lopan river. Another version links the name to that of a legendary cossack Derkach who, it said, was the town's founder. After 1943, the Soviet local authorities  rejected the Ukrainian variant of the name with letter k and began to use only the Russian version, Derhachi (with letter h). Later, the Russian pronunciation was officially installed in Ukrainian official settlements classification.

Geography

Location 

The town lies in the valley of the Lopan river, north-west of Ukraine's second largest city Kharkiv. Most of the town is located on the plain, on the left bank of Lopan River. The western edge of the settlement is hilly and full of ravines.  The Lopan riverbed has many artificial channels and small tributaries at this point. The T2103 Regional Highway passes through Derhachi from the north-west to south-east, connecting it with Kharkiv and Zolochiv. There is an extensive uninhabited and forested area to the south-west of the town.

Climate 
Derhachi has a humid continental climate, Dfb by Köppen climate classification, with warm summers, but it lacks a dry season. The average annual temperature is 7.3 °C. Annual rainfall is around 535 mm.

History

The Scythian period (500-200 BC) 
It has been established that the present area of today's town was populated in Scythian times (6th-3rd centuries B.C.) and later. A unique Scythian ritual pommel decorated with a sphinx was found in the town. This artefact formed part of a Scythian World Tree and is now on show at the Kharkiv Historical Museum. In 2018 and 2019, an archaeological expedition from Kharkiv Historical Museum carried out excavations of the Scythian kurgan or burial mound in the western part of Derhachi. Scholars examined the mounds and put together a collection of items that provided information about the funeral rites of the Scythian period.

The Cossack era 
In the 17th century Derkachi was a sotnia town of the Kharkiv Sloboda Cossack Regiment. Up to 1742 there was one cossacks sotnia administration there; from 1742 to 1765 there were two. Traditionally, a sotnyk (head of a sotnia) in Derkachi was a member of a family, well known in Sloboda Ukraine, the Kowalewskis (Dołęga coat of arms). The town had its own symbols. The sotnia standard used an image of the Archangel Michael. The town seal contained an image of the derkach (corn crake) surmounted by an octagram. According to 1779 documents, Derkachi was a military sloboda of the Kharkiv povit (uyezd) with a population of 2,287 citizens.

Russian empire 
During Tsarist times, Derkachi was a settlement within Kharkov Governorate of the Russian Empire.

Soviet times

Holodomor: the man-made famine of 1932-1933 
At least 274 of the town's residents died in the Holodomor, the man-made famine in Soviet Ukraine in 1932 and 1933. The officials of Derkachi town council were involved in expropriation of local citizens property in 1932.

Second World War 
Derhachi spent 630 days during the Eastern Front under the occupation of the German Army, from 21 October 1941 to 13 August 1943; save for a period during the Third Battle of Kharkov in February 1943 when it was briefly recaptured by the Red Army.  The town would be liberated later that year during the Belgorod–Kharkov offensive operation.

Post-War 
In January 1989, the town's population was 22,915 people.

Independent Ukraine (since 1991) 
In January 2013, the town population was 18,154 people.

Until 18 July 2020, Derhachi was the administrative center of Derhachi Raion. The raion was abolished in July 2020 as part of the administrative reform of Ukraine, which reduced the number of raions or districts in the Kharkiv Oblast to seven. The area of Derhachi Raion was merged into Kharkiv Raion.

During the 2022 Russian invasion of Ukraine, the town saw shelling and fighting as part of the Battle of Kharkiv, resulting in civilian casualties. On 12 May 2022, the local palace of culture was shelled by a BM-27 Uragan MLRS, killing two people and wounding four. Later, on the night of May 12–13, the building was completely destroyed by a missile strike.

Transportation

Trains

The town has 3 railway stops operated by Ukrainian Railways: Derhachi, Motorna and Novi Derhachi. The largest stop Derhachi has a station building. All stops are used only by commuter trains running on the line Kharkiv - Kozacha Lopan. Before 2014 there was a direct commuter train connection with towns in the adjacent Belhorod Region of Russia.

Buses

Derhachi has a bus connection with the city of Kharkiv. The buses on this route go via the central street Sumsky Shliakh, then pass through the town of Mala Danylivka to the center of Kharkiv (bus station Tsentralnyi Rynok).

Derhachi also has an internal town bus route, which mainly runs along the central streets (Sumskyi Shliakh and Zolochivskyi Shliakh). The town has a direct connection with the neighboring raion center Zolochiv.

Metro
In the 1980s, when planning the Oleksiivska line of the Kharkiv Metro, it was planned to build a Dergachi metro station, but it has not yet been constructed.

Economy
Most enterprises are concentrated in the industrial zone in south Derhachi, near the Motorna railway halt.

The largest enterprises in the town are: the UBC Group which manufactures refrigeration and brewing equipment and  Amcor which produces packaging for the tobacco industry.

Derhachi is the manufacturing base of the BRIG company, one of the world's leading manufacturers of rigid-hulled inflatable boats.

Notable people

Born in the town
 Panas (Afanasi) Matushenko who led the mutiny on the Russian battleship Potemkin in 1905.

Lived or worked in the town
 Hnat Khotkevych was a Ukrainian writer, ethnographer, composer, and bandurist. As a student in 1895, he organized a village theater in Derkachi. In 1920-1928 he taught Ukrainian language and literature in the Derkachi zoo technical school
 Oleksandr Oles was a Ukrainian writer and poet. In 1893 he entered the agricultural college in Derkachi, where he published the first verses.

Media 
Since Soviet times, the town has had a newspaper, established in 1939 by the local Communist Party committee.

The newspaper has changed its name five times since then (see below):

 By the way of Stalin, 28 July 1939 – 4 November 1956;
 The truth of Lenin, 1957–1962;
 The tribune of the working people, 1962–1967; 
 The way of Lenin, 1967-10 October 1991; and
 The news of Derhachi land, since 10 October 1991

Twin towns — Sister cities
Derhachi is twinned with:
  Sosnowiec, Silesian Voivodeship, Poland

Image gallery

References

Cities in Kharkiv Oblast
Kharkovsky Uyezd
Cities of district significance in Ukraine
Cities and towns built in the Sloboda Ukraine